The 1929 Nevada Wolf Pack football team was an American football team that represented the University of Nevada in the Far Western Conference (FWC) during the 1929 college football season. In their first season under head coach George Philbrook, the team compiled a 2–5–1 record (2–1 FWC) and finished second in the conference.

Schedule

References

Nevada
Nevada Wolf Pack football seasons
Nevada Football